Integrity-aware parallelizable mode (IAPM) is a mode of operation for cryptographic block ciphers.  As its name implies, it allows for a parallel mode of operation for higher throughput.

Encryption and authentication
At the time of its creation, IAPM was one of the first cipher modes to provide both authentication and privacy in a single pass.  (In earlier authenticated encryption designs, two passes would be required to: one to encrypt, and the second to compute a MAC.)

IAPM was proposed for use in IPsec.

Other AEAD schemes also provide all of the single pass, privacy and authentication properties. IAPM has mostly been supplanted by Galois/counter mode.

See also
 OCB mode

References

Block cipher modes of operation
Authenticated-encryption schemes